Burlington Indians may refer to:

 Burlington Royals, known as the Burlington Indians from 1986 to 2006
 Burlington Rangers, known as the Burlington Indians from 1958 to 1964
 Burlington Bees, known as the Burlington Indians from 1947 to 1949

Cleveland Guardians minor league affiliates